The Good Shepherd Convent is an English-medium high school in Chennai, Tamil Nadu, India.

History
The school was established in 1925 in India, the roots of the convent grew as early as in 1835 in France when Sister Mary Euphrasia, sowed the seeds for the growth of the institution which has now become one of the premier group of educational institutions in Chennai and other parts of the country.

Notable alumni

 Vyjayantimala - Bollywood actress
 Sudha Shah - one of the first women cricketers in India
 Shriya Reddy - VJ and actress
 Sudha Ragunathan - vocalist
 Chitra Ramanathan - Contemporary Indian American Visual Artist 
 Paloma Rao - VJ
Raadhika - Kollywood actress
Shweta Mohan-Playback Singer
Reshmi Menon - Kollywood  actress
Rati Agnihotri - Indian actress
Dipika Pallikal Karthik -  Indian Squash Player
Sakshi Agarwal-Kollywood actress and model

References

Schools in Chennai
Schools in Colonial India
1923 establishments in India

H